Justice Pratt may refer to:

Abner Pratt, associate justice of the Michigan Supreme Court
Daniel Pratt (New York politician), justice of the New York Supreme Court and ex officio a judge of the New York Court of Appeals
Eugene C. Pratt, associate justice of the Utah Supreme Court
Orville C. Pratt, associate justice of the Oregon Supreme Court